Path of Destruction is a novel in the Star Wars saga and is centered on the life of Darth Bane and the fall of the first Sith order. It was written by Drew Karpyshyn and was released on September 26, 2006. The book takes place roughly 1,000 years before Star Wars Episode IV: A New Hope.

Synopsis 
The Sith Order used to have many members, but there were flaws with this. They were divided, battling each other to be the highest of Sith ranks. One Sith Lord sought to end this, so he erected the Brotherhood of Darkness, where all Sith were equal and had two goals in mind. To conquer the galaxy, and destroy the Jedi.

Dessel has lived and worked in the Apatros Cortosis Mines his entire life with an abusive drunk for a father. He dreams of the day that may never come—when he finally gets to leave the desolated planet of Apatros. One day, when a not-so-friendly game of sabacc with some Republic soldiers turns deadly, Dessel is suddenly in need of an escape route.

As his only way of escape, Dessel is smuggled off of the planet to join the Sith Army. He joined the bloody war between the Jedi and the Sith, working his way up the ranks of his unit, the Gloom Walkers, due to his strength, cunning, and his power over the Force. But the Sith Masters have much bigger plans than Dessel knows—if he can prove himself.

Dessel is taken to the Sith Academy on Korriban. He thinks it's because he is being punished for disobeying the direct orders of a superior officer. But little does Des know, he's on his way to becoming a member of the Brotherhood of Darkness.

As a student of the Sith, Dessel is studying the secrets of the Dark Side under its greatest masters and embracing his new title: Bane. But in a dream, he realizes that he unconsciously killed his father when he was younger through the Force. This causes self-doubt to cripple his abilities. To try to redeem himself and regain control over the dark side of the Force, Bane challenges Sirak, the Academy's most powerful student. But it is in vain, as he is nearly killed in the battle. The Sith masters turn their backs on him and forbid anyone from teaching him anything. 

He is nursed back to health and tutored by the beautiful and cunning Githany, a fellow student and former Jedi, in secret. After a time, Bane overcomes his self-doubt and regains his connection to the Force, redeeming himself by crushing Sirak in a duel. He then leaves the Sith Academy, searching the Valley of the Dark Lords for teachings by the original Sith Lords. But after he finds nothing of value in the Valley, Bane returns to the Sith Academy for the night. Githany comes to his room and invites him to the archives to study. Bane, knowing it is a trap, goes anyway. Sirak, believing he is working with Githany, is there waiting for him with two of his goons to kill him. But Githany was tricking Sirak, and quickly dispatches his two accomplices. After a brief duel, Bane disarmed Sirak, and ignoring his pleas for mercy, decapitates him.

Bane, realizing that the Sith masters of the Brotherhood no longer had anything to teach him, left Korriban for the planet Lehon. After a brief search, Bane finds the holocron of Darth Revan. Revan tells Bane that too many Sith leads to infighting, and is one of the biggest reasons why the Sith can never defeat the Jedi. Revan goes on to explain his Rule of Two: one master and one apprentice would allow the Sith to avoid infighting and concentrate only on destroying the Jedi and conquering the galaxy. 

Lord Kaan, leader of the Brotherhood, finds out what Bane has done and sends Kas'im, the swordmaster at the Sith Academy, after him. Kas'im is to either kill Bane or get him to rejoin the Brotherhood. Bane rejects the Brotherhood, and takes on the ancient Sith title of Darth, calling himself Darth Bane. Kas'im engages Bane is a lightsaber duel, and after a pitched battle where Kas'im almost kills him, Bane finally gains the upper hand and kills the swordmaster. 

Kaan then sends Githany to kill Bane, hoping her intimate connection to him will allow her to get close. She poisons Bane with a kiss, by masking an odorless poison with the Rock Worrt venom. Githany left Bane for dead, but the new Sith lord used his connection to the dark side to keep himself alive until he was able to find Caleb, a legendary healer. Caleb initially refused to help Bane, but when he threatened the healer's daughter, Caleb relented and provided Bane with an antidote for the poison. 

Bane, putting his plan in motion, contacted Lord Kaan offering him a gift, a Sith ritual called the Thought Bomb that he had learned from Darth Revan's holocron. The ritual would destroy all force-sensitive beings within a large radius. Bane arrives on the planet Ruusan where the Sith and Jedi have been fighting for weeks. He convinces Lord Kaan and all of the other members of the Brotherhood of Darkness to use the Thought Bomb when the Jedi, led by Master Hoth, make their final assault. Bane sneaks away to a safe distance as the Brotherhood moves underground to a system of caves. When the Jedi attack, Kaan and every member of the Brotherhood of Darkness use their collective force powers to summon, and then detonate, the Thought Bomb. Realizing too late that Bane had tricked him, Kaan, Githany, the Sith Lords, and many of the Jedi to include Master Hoth, were destroyed. Bane had brought down the Brotherhood of Darkness, leaving himself as the only Sith left in the galaxy. 

As he prepares to leave Ruusan, Bane finds a young Force-sensitive girl named Rain. She had just used the force to kill two Jedi scouts in a fit of anger. Sensing her rage, Darth Bane takes her as his apprentice, and she becomes Darth Zannah.

Reception
Darth Bane: Path of Destruction reached 11 on the New York Times bestseller list on October 15, 2006.

This novel has a rating of 4.7 out of 5 stars on Amazon.

References

External links
 
 Review at Geeks of Doom

2006 American novels
2006 science fiction novels
Canadian science fiction novels
Star Wars Legends novels
Del Rey books
American science fiction novels